The Last Temptation of Reid is the debut studio album by Lard, released in 1990.

The album includes a cover of "They're Coming To Take Me Away, Ha-Haaa!", originally performed by Napoleon XIV, with the addition of a guitar part and an extra verse (written by Jello Biafra) to the original song's setup. The album also includes the song "Forkboy" which was used on the Natural Born Killers soundtrack and covered by Flotsam and Jetsam (on their album, High) and industrial rock act Black Light Burns.

The vinyl LP version of the album does not include the track "I Am Your Clock", which was instead released as a separate 12" Single.

The album's title is a reference to the Martin Scorsese film, The Last Temptation of Christ. A movie poster for the film is included in the liner notes of the album, only with the name "Reid" pasted over "Christ" in the title. "Reid" refers to Reid Hyams, who recorded the group's first EP, The Power of Lard, and co-owned Chicago Trax. A photo of Hyams can be seen on the back cover of the vinyl issue of the album and in the booklet of the CD.

Track listing
All songs written by Biafra/Jourgensen/Barker/Ward, except when noted.

"Forkboy"  – 3:53
"Pineapple Face" – 6:37
"Mate Spawn & Die"  – 4:55
"Drug Raid At 4 AM" – 5:01
"Can God Fill Teeth?" – 4:20
"Bozo Skeleton" – 4:30
"Sylvestre Matuschka" – 3:54
"They're Coming to Take Me Away" – 8:28 (N. Bonaparte)
"I Am Your Clock" – 15:29

Personnel

Lard
Jello Biafra – lead vocals, deprogramming, sleeve concept, back cover photo
Alien Jourgensen – guitars, programming, production
Paul Barker – bass, programming, production
Jeff Ward – drums (2, 4–9), vocals

Additional personnel
William Rieflin – drums (1, 3)
Jeff Newell – engineer
Winston Smith – front cover artwork & "Ant People" (rear cover artwork)
John Yates – sleeve design

Charts

References

1990 debut albums
Albums produced by Al Jourgensen
Alternative Tentacles albums
Lard (band) albums